Liu Shangqing (1868 – 20 February 1947) was a Chinese politician. He was also known by the courtesy name Haiquan.

Life and career
Li was a native of Tieling County, Liaoning, which was then known as Fengtian. At the age of 20, Li began teaching at a private school. In 1911, he began working for the Viceroy of the Three Northeast Provinces. After completing his legal studies, Li was appointed to senior positions within the provincial bank. Li left to work for Zhang Zuolin.

In 1919, Li returned to public service as acting director of the Heilongjiang department of finance. He was formally appointed to the position the next year, and concurrently served as president of a bank in Yongji. Li became operations director of the Chinese Eastern Railway in September 1925. Li returned to his home province as director of the Fengtian department of finance in 1926. That November, Li took office as president of Northeastern University. He returned to Fengtian in October to assume the governorship, yielding the agricultural portfolio to Mo Teh-hui. Li stepped down from Northeastern University in August 1928.

Shortly after Zhang Zoulin's death, his son and successor Zhang Xueliang declared that he would not oppose the Nationalist government. Subsequently, Liu also allied himself with the Nationalists, and was named interior minister in December 1930. He concurrently held other committee-level posts, and left the interior ministry in December 1931.

He returned to municipal government in Beijing in 1932. He left Beijing in 1937 to take several positions in the Anhui Provincial Government, all of which he had resigned by December. In December 1941, Liu became vice president of the Control Yuan. He fell ill and sought medical treatment in the United States soon after the end of the Second Sino-Japanese War.

He died in New York on 20 February 1947, aged 80. Liu was eventually returned to China, and interred at a cemetery in Haidian District on 16 August 1948.

参考文献 

1868 births
1947 deaths
Republic of China politicians from Liaoning
People from Tieling
Members of the Control Yuan
Interior Ministers of the Republic of China
Chinese bankers
Academic staff of the Northeastern University (China)
Burials in Beijing
Educators from Liaoning